Hemmatabad-e Zamanabad may refer to:
Hemmatabad
Hemmatabad-e Zamani